Amy Alisara Arirachakaran (born May 1, 1986; Thai: อลิศรา อารีราชการัณย์) is a Thai-American figure skater. She represented Thailand in the 2003 Asian Winter Games, the Junior Grand Prix, Skate Asia, and the 1st Hong Kong Bauhinia Cup Figure Skating Invitational.

Programs

Competitive highlights

References

External links
 

1986 births
Amy Alisara Arirachakaran
American female single skaters
Sportspeople from Tulsa, Oklahoma
Amy Alisara Arirachakaran
Living people
Figure skaters at the 2003 Asian Winter Games
American sportspeople of Thai descent